Patrick Genestier (born June 1, 1954) is a French sprint canoer who competed in the late 1970s. He was eliminated in the semifinals of the K-1 1000 m event at the 1976 Summer Olympics in Montreal.

References
Sports-reference.com profile

1954 births
Canoeists at the 1976 Summer Olympics
French male canoeists
Living people
Olympic canoeists of France
Place of birth missing (living people)
20th-century French people